Alabama Crimson Tide football yearly statistical leaders identifies the yearly statistical leaders for the Alabama Crimson Tide football program. It includes the program's leaders in rushing yards, passing yards, and receiving yards.

Rushing, passing, and receiving

Scoring, field goals, and extra points

See also
 Alabama Crimson Tide football statistical leaders

References